Aguada may refer to:

Places

Central and South America
 Aguada, Santander, a town and municipality in northeastern Colombia
 Aguada, Montevideo, a neighbourhood of Montevideo, Uruguay
 Aguada, Puerto Rico, a municipality of Puerto Rico
 Aguada de Pasajeros, a municipality and town in Cienfuegos Province, Cuba
 Isla Aguada, a locality in Carmen Municipality, Campeche, Mexico
 La Aguada, Pichilemu, a village in Cardenal Caro Province, Chile
La Aguada y Costa Azul, a village in the Rocha Department, Uruguay

Asia
 Aguada, a district of Placer, Masbate, Philippines
 Fort Aguada, a 17th-century fort in Goa, India
 Castella de Aguada, a fort in Bandra, Mumbai, India

Europe
Aguada de Cima, a civil parish in Águeda, Centro Region, Portugal

Other uses
 Aguada (meteorite), a meteorite which fell in 1930 near Cordoba, Argentina

See also
 Águeda (disambiguation)
 Salinas y Aguada Blanca National Reserve, Peru
 Mossel Bay, South Africa, originally called Aguada de São Brás